Sony Michel (born February 17, 1995) is an American football running back who is a free agent. He played college football at Georgia and was selected by the New England Patriots in the first round of the 2018 NFL Draft. As a member of the Patriots for three seasons, he won a Super Bowl title in Super Bowl LIII and scored the game's only touchdown. Michel was traded to the Los Angeles Rams in 2021, where he won Super Bowl LVI. He joined the Dolphins the following offseason, but was cut before the season began, then signed with the Los Angeles Chargers.

Early years
Michel's parents emigrated from Haiti a year after his older sister Lamise was born. Michel attended American Heritage School in Plantation, Florida. Michel was the starting running back for the American Heritage Patriots, beginning in his eighth grade year there. As a senior, he rushed for 1,833 yards and 24 touchdowns. Over three years playing on varsity, he rushed for 4,758 yards and 63 touchdowns. He was rated by Rivals.com as a five-star recruit and was ranked as the third best running back and 13th best player overall. Michel committed to the University of Georgia on April 26, 2013, to play college football. 

Michel also competed in track and field at American Heritage; as a sophomore in 2011, he earned first-place finishes in both the 100-meter dash (10.99s) and 200-meter dash (21.91s) at the FHSAA 2A District Meet. He posted a personal-best time of 10.64w in the 100-meter dash at the 3rd Annual Miramar Invitational, where he placed first.

College career
As a true freshman at Georgia in 2014, Michel played in eight games and made one start. He missed five games due to a fractured shoulder blade. He rushed for 410 yards on 64 carries with five rushing touchdowns. Michel entered 2015 as a backup to Nick Chubb, but earned extensive playing time. After Chubb was injured in a game against the Tennessee Volunteers, Michel took over as the starter and ran for 145 yards. In the 2016 season, Michel totaled 840 rushing yards and four rushing touchdowns to go along with 22 receptions for 149 receiving yards and a receiving touchdown.

In 2017, with true freshman Jake Fromm starting at quarterback for the Bulldogs, the team relied heavily on its senior running backs, Chubb and Michel, to carry the load. Despite remaining second in the depth chart behind Chubb, and receiving only two-thirds as many carries as Chubb, Michel had a breakout year, finishing with 1,227 rushing yards (156 carries), only 118 yards fewer than Chubb's 1,345 (223 carries). In a blowout game against Vanderbilt on October 7, Michel rushed for 150 yards and a score on only 12 carries. Three weeks later, in an October 28 rout of Florida, Michel rushed for 137 yards on only 6 carries, scoring twice on runs of 74 yards and 45 yards.

Michel's biggest game of the year came on New Year's Day against Oklahoma in the Rose Bowl, Georgia's first-ever College Football Playoff game. Carrying the ball only 11 times, Michel ran for 181 yards and three touchdowns, including a walk-off 27-yard rushing touchdown from the "Wild Dawg" formation (direct snap to Michel) to end the game in double overtime. He also added four receptions for 41 yards and a fourth touchdown. For his performance, Michel was named Rose Bowl Offensive MVP.

Chubb and Michel's 326 combined rushing yards in the Rose Bowl put them at 8,259 career rushing yards, surpassing Eric Dickerson and Craig James' FBS record of 8,192.

College statistics

Professional career

Michel was selected by the New England Patriots in the first round of the 2018 NFL Draft with the 31st overall pick. He was the third running back to be selected that year. In addition, he was the third of six Georgia Bulldogs to be selected that year. Michel and Isaiah Wynn were the first pair of college teammates selected by the same team in the first round since Auburn players Jason Campbell and Carlos Rogers were taken in the 2005 NFL Draft by the Washington Redskins.

New England Patriots

2018 season

Michel suffered a knee injury in training camp causing him to miss the entire preseason and the season-opener against the Houston Texans. He made his NFL debut in Week 2 against the Jacksonville Jaguars. He rushed 10 times for 34 yards and had a six-yard reception in the 31–20 road loss. Two weeks later against the Miami Dolphins, he had a breakout game with 26 carries for 112 yards and a touchdown in the 38–7 victory. Michel became the first rookie to top 100 rushing yards in a game for the Patriots since Brandon Bolden in 2012. In the next game against the Indianapolis Colts, Michel rushed for 98 yards and a touchdown as the Patriots won 38–24. In the next game against the Kansas City Chiefs, he rushed for 106 yards and two touchdowns in a narrow 43–40 victory on Sunday Night Football. In the process, Michel became the first New England rookie to score on the ground twice in a game since Laurence Maroney in 2006. During a Week 12 27–13 road victory over the New York Jets, he ran for a career-high 133 yards and a touchdown, the most rushing yards by a Patriot rookie since Brandon Bolden ran for 137 yards in 2012. This game was his third time breaking the century mark, making him the first Patriots rookie since Robert Edwards did so in 1998. In a Week 16 victory against the Buffalo Bills, Michel had 18 carries for 116 yards and a touchdown. 

Michel finished his rookie year with 931 rushing yards and six touchdowns along with seven receptions for 50 yards. The Patriots finished atop the AFC East with an 11–5 record and earned the No. 2 seed for the AFC Playoffs, including a first-round bye. In the Divisional Round against the Los Angeles Chargers, Michel had 24 carries for 129 yards and three touchdowns in a 41–28 victory. During the AFC Championship against the Chiefs, he ran for 113 yards and two touchdowns on 29 carries in the 37–31 overtime road victory. Michel broke the NFL record for most playoff rushing touchdowns for a rookie, scoring five between the divisional and conference championship games. On February 3, 2019, he scored the only touchdown in Super Bowl LIII against the Los Angeles Rams, carrying 18 times for a game-leading 94 yards. The go-ahead touchdown occurred in the middle of the fourth quarter in the 13–3 victory. Michel was the leading rusher in the game and extended his rookie postseason rushing record to six touchdowns in three games; he scored six touchdowns in 13 regular-season games. Only Hall of Fame running back Terrell Davis has rushed for more touchdowns in a single postseason than Michel; Davis scored eight touchdowns in four games in the 1997 postseason. Michel is the first player since Davis with more than four rushing touchdowns in one postseason.

2019 season

During Week 2 against the Miami Dolphins, Michel rushed 21 times for 83 yards and his first rushing touchdown of the season in the 43–0 shutout road victory. Three weeks later against the Washington Redskins, he rushed 16 times for 91 yards and a touchdown and caught three passes for 32 yards in the 33–7 road victory. Two weeks later against the New York Jets, Michel rushed 19 times for 42 yards and three touchdowns in the 33–0 shutout road victory.

Overall, Michel finished the 2019 season with 247 carries for 912 rushing yards and seven touchdowns along with 12 receptions for 94 yards.

2020 season

Michel was placed on the active/physically unable to perform list at the start of training camp on August 2, 2020. He was activated from the list on August 26. In Week 3, Michel recorded 140 scrimmage yards (117 rushing, 23 receiving) in the 36–20 victory over the Las Vegas Raiders. He was placed on injured reserve on October 5, 2020, with a quadriceps injury. He was placed on the reserve/COVID-19 list by the Patriots on October 17, 2020, and removed from the list back to injured reserve on October 31. He was activated off of injured reserve on November 21, 2020. In Week 17 against the New York Jets, Michel carried the ball 16 times for 76 yards, and caught three passes for 60 yards and his first career receiving touchdown during the 28–14 win. Overall, Michel finished the 2020 season with 449 rushing yards and one touchdown, along with seven receptions for 114 yards and one touchdown.

Los Angeles Rams

2021 season

Michel was traded to the Los Angeles Rams on August 25, 2021, in exchange for a fifth and sixth round pick in the 2022 NFL Draft. In Week 13, against the Jacksonville Jaguars, he had 24 carries for 121 rushing yards and one rushing touchdown in the 37–7 victory. In Week 16, against the Minnesota Vikings, he had 27 carries for 131 rushing yards and a rushing touchdown in the 30–23 victory. He finished the 2021 season with 208 carries for 845 rushing yards and four rushing touchdowns to go along with 21 receptions for 128 receiving yards and one receiving touchdown. Michel won his second Super Bowl title when the Rams defeated the Cincinnati Bengals in Super Bowl LVI. In the Super Bowl, Michel had two carries for two yards.

Miami Dolphins
On May 10, 2022, Michel signed with the Miami Dolphins. He was released on August 29, 2022.

Los Angeles Chargers
On August 31, 2022, Michel signed with the Los Angeles Chargers. He was released on December 31, 2022.

NFL career statistics

Regular season

Postseason

NFL records
 Most rushing touchdowns in a postseason by a rookie: 6

Personal life
Michel's older brother Marken Michel is a wide receiver for the Washington Commanders of the National Football League, and was the 2017 West Division Most Outstanding Rookie with the Calgary Stampeders of the Canadian Football League.

Michel is a Christian. Michel has said, “Without Jesus Christ, our Lord and Savior, there is none of this. We get all this glory, but the glory is not for us, it’s for Him. We do this for Him. That’s kind of my purpose. So really, none of this matters to me.”

References

External links

Los Angeles Rams bio
Georgia Bulldogs bio

1995 births
Living people
American football running backs
American sportspeople of Haitian descent
Georgia Bulldogs football players
Miami Dolphins players
New England Patriots players
Los Angeles Rams players
Los Angeles Chargers players
People from Plantation, Florida
Players of American football from Florida
Sportspeople from Broward County, Florida
American Heritage School (Florida) alumni